The Fort Garry Horse Museum & Archives is a regimental museum in Winnipeg, Manitoba, Canada that displays the history of The Fort Garry Horse, a regiment of the Canadian Forces Army, from its origin to the present through use of artefacts, photographs and archival material.

Located in the LCol Harcus Strachan, VC, MC Armoury(formerly named McGregor Armoury), the museum's exhibits include uniforms, weapons, military artefacts and photographs, as well as some military vehicles outdoors.

The museum preserves the history of the regiment through the collection of documents, pictures, books, military artefacts, etc., pertaining to the Regiment. The museum preserves the history of Cavalry in Manitoba through the collection of documents, pictures, books, military artefacts, etc.
It provides a training facility for the teaching of Regimental history. The museum's goal is to  stimulate and foster within the general public an ongoing interest in the Regiment and its activities and accomplishments.

Affiliations
The Museum is affiliated with: CMA,  CHIN, AMM, and Virtual Museum of Canada.

See also

 Organization of Military Museums of Canada

References

Regimental museums in Canada
Museums in Winnipeg
Archives in Canada
Equestrian museums